Svedin is a Swedish surname. Notable people with the surname include:

Annie Svedin (born 1991), Swedish ice hockey player
Frida Svedin Thunström (born 1989), Swedish ice hockey player
Helen Svedin (born 1976), Swedish model

Swedish-language surnames